During the European migrant crisis, refugee asylum centers in Sweden have been the target of a series of arson attacks thought to have been carried out by ideologically-motivated  anti-immigration nationalist Swedes.

In September 2015, 4 refugee centers were set on fire in suspected arsons.  

In September 2016 refugee centre in Stockholm was destroyed in a suspected arson attack. 

In June 2017 two fires were set at an asylum center near Ystad.

See also
2014 mosque arson attacks in Sweden
List of grenade attacks in Sweden
Malmö mosque arson attacks
2010 & 2012 Malmö synagogue arson attack
Terrorism in Sweden
Trollhättan school attack

References

2015 crimes in Sweden
2016 crimes in Sweden
Arson in Sweden
Xenophobia in Europe
Hate crimes in Europe